The County of Flinders is one of the 49 cadastral counties of South Australia. The county covers the southern part of the Eyre Peninsula “bounded on the north by a line connecting Point Drummond with Cape Burr, and on all other sides by the seacoast, including all islands adjacent to the main land.”

History
The county was proclaimed by George Grey, the third Governor of South Australia, on 2 June 1842. The county originally extended from Cape Wiles on the west side of the peninsula to Cape Catastrophe in the south and to the “northern extremity of Louth Bay” on the Peninsula’s east coast. The county was enlarged to its present extent in 1872. It was named by Grey after Matthew Flinders, the British navigator.

The District Council of Lincoln was established at Port Lincoln in 1880, the earliest local government within the county. In 1888, the enactment of the District Councils Act 1887 brought the entire county under the governance of the Lincoln council.

List of constituent hundreds

Location of constituent hundreds
The county consists of 15 hundreds.  The hundreds are laid out from east to west in five rows (from north to south) as follows:
 Ulipa, Cummins, Stokes and Yaranyacka all along the northern boundary of the county,
Warrow, Mortlock, Koppio and Hutchison,
Lake Wangary, Wanilla and Louth,
Uley and Lincoln, and
Sleaford and Flinders at the southern end of Eyre Peninsula.

Hundred of Cummins 
The Hundred of Cummins was proclaimed on 15 January 1903. It is entirely located within the boundaries of the locality of Cummins.

Hundred of Flinders
The Hundred of Flinders was proclaimed on 26 November 1903. Its boundaries coincide with the boundaries of the locality of  Lincoln National Park.

Hundred of Hutchison

The Hundred of Hutchison was proclaimed in 1867 and is home to Tumby Bay township and surrounds as well as a small eastern portion of Yallunda Flat locality.

Hundred of Koppio
The Hundred of Koppio was proclaimed on 24 October 1867. Its northern half is within the locality of  Yallunda Flat while its southern half is in  Koppio and its south-east corner is in  Tumby Bay.

Hundred of Lake Wangary
The Hundred of Lake Wangary was proclaimed on 16 February 1871. Its extent includes the localities of  Coffin Bay, Kellidie Bay, Little Douglas and Mount Dutton Bay and part of the locality of Wangary.

Hundred of Lincoln
The Hundred of Lincoln was proclaimed on 7 August 1851. Its extent includes the full extent of the localities of Boston, Duck Ponds, Hawson, Port Lincoln, Tiatukia and Tulka, parts of the localities of Coomunga,  North Shields and  Tootenilla as well as all of the island of Boston Island.

Hundred of Louth 
The Hundred of Louth was proclaimed on 7 August 1851. Its extent includes the full extent of the localities of  Point Boston,  Poonindie,  Louth Bay,  Whites Flat and Whites River, parts of the localities of  Charlton Gully,  Green Patch,  North Shields, Tumby Bay and  Wanilla as well as all of the island of Louth Island.

Hundred of Mortlock 
The Hundred of Mortlock was proclaimed on 20 October 1904.

Hundred of Sleaford 
The Hundred of Sleaford was proclaimed on 10 August 1871. Its extent aligns with that of the locality of Sleaford with one exception in its north-east corner where part of the adjoining locality of Tulka extends into the hundred.

Hundred of Stokes

The Hundred of Stokes was proclaimed on 21 November 1878 and includes the locality of Cockaleechie and parts of the localities of Ungarra, Tumby Bay and Yallunda Flat.

Hundred of Uley 
The Hundred of Uley was proclaimed on 10 August 1871. The majority of Its extent is in the locality of  Uley with a portion of  Coomunga in its north-east corner.

Hundred of Ulipa
The Hundred of Ulipa was proclaimed on 18 September 1879. The majority of Its extent is in the locality of  Mount Drummond with portions of the following localities overlapping its boundaries from north to south - Mount Hope,  Kappinnie, .Cummins and  Coulta.

Hundred of Wanilla
The Hundred of Wanilla was proclaimed on 10 August 1871.  Its name is derived from an Aboriginal name for “a nearby spring.”  Its extent includes the localities of Fountain and Pearlah in its south with the locality of Wanilla occupying its northern half with portions of Charlton Gully and Green Patch on its east side and with Wangary on its west side.

Hundred of Warrow
The Hundred of Warrow was proclaimed on 15 July 1869. Two possible sources exist for the name. The first is an “Aboriginal word referring to the loud voice of the storm or referring to spirits rushing down gullies” while the second is “native ‘warraw’ meaning ‘wind in gully’ which was offered by a pastoralist named McMoyan in 1943. The majority of Its extent is in the locality of  Coulta with a portion of Cummins in its north-east corner and the locality of  Farm Beach.

Hundred of Yaranyacka
The Hundred of Yaranyacka was proclaimed on 20 June 1872.  Its name is derived from an Aboriginal word.  Its extent includes the full extent of the locality of  Lipson with a portion of Ungarra in its north-west corner.

See also
 Electoral district of Flinders

References

Flinders
Eyre Peninsula